The 1936 Iowa gubernatorial election was held on November 3, 1936. Democratic nominee Nelson G. Kraschel narrowly defeated Republican nominee George A. Wilson with 48.56% of the vote.

Primary elections
Primary elections were held on June 1, 1936.

Democratic primary

Candidates
Nelson G. Kraschel, incumbent Lieutenant Governor
Richard F. Mitchell, Associate Justice of the Iowa Supreme Court

Results

Republican primary

Candidates
George A. Wilson, former State Senator
John M. Grimes 
George R. Call

Results

General election

Candidates
Major party candidates
Nelson G. Kraschel, Democratic 
George A. Wilson, Republican

Other candidates
Wallace M. Short, Farmer–Labor
Ted Fitch, Prohibition
J. P. Russell, Socialist

Results

References

1936
Iowa
Gubernatorial